Crkvine is a village situated in Mladenovac municipality in Serbia.

References

Populated places in Serbia